Marco Barbo (1420 – 2 March 1491) of Venice was a cardinal of the Roman Catholic Church (1467) and patriarch of Aquileia (1470).

He was a member of the noble Barbo family and a third cousin of Pietro Barbo, who became Pope Paul II. In Rome Marco Barbo resided in the Palazzo di San Marco, as did the Venetian pope, who elected not to remove to the Vatican. From 1467 he was the cardinal patron of the Knights of Rhodes, for whom he built the loggia on the imperial forums.<ref>G. Fiorini, La casa dei cavallieri di Rodo (Rome, 1951:64ff, figs 63, 64).</ref>

At Paul's death, he was absent from Rome for several years; on his return he commissioned Paul's tomb from Mino da Fiesole, who completed it in 1477 for Old St. Peter's Basilica; fragments are conserved in the Vatican Museums. Barbo participated in the Papal conclave, 1471, which elected Pope Sixtus IV. Barbo was made legate to Germany, Hungary and Poland by Pope Sixtus IV. On 22 February 1472 Barbo left Rome, sent by the Pope to inspire Frederick III, Holy Roman Emperor to combat the Ottoman Turks. Barbo returned to Rome 26 October 1474. Possessed of several abbacies in commendam, he was elected Camerlengo of the Sacred College of Cardinals and bishop of Palestrina (1478), where he restored the cathedral.

His diplomacy defused the partisan tensions that were building in Rome before the conclave of 1484. For a price, he secured the Castel Sant'Angelo from Girolamo Riario and convinced both Orsini and Colonna factions to evacuate the city, leaving the conclave in security and peace. During the consistory, Barbo was one of those considered papabile; the election of Pope Innocent VIII was a compromise effected between cardinals Della Rovere and Rodrigo Borgia (later Pope Alexander VI) to block the candidacy of the Cardinal of St. Mark.

Barbo was the eldest son of Marino Barbo and Filippa della Riva. He was an erudite patron of the humanists so distrusted by Paul II, but as chancellor of the Sapienza'', he was constrained to withhold the salary of Pomponio Leto, who had fled to Venice. Marco Barbo assembled an outstanding library; generous and charitable, he distributed all his wealth to the poor of Rome at his death.

Works

Notes

1420 births
1491 deaths
Marco
Cardinal-bishops of Palestrina
Cardinal-nephews
15th-century Italian cardinals
Republic of Venice clergy
15th-century Venetian people